Feeding is the process of ingesting food to provide for an animal's nutritional needs.

Feeding may also refer to:

 The Feeding, a 2006 horror film
 The Feeding (album), a 2005 alternative metal album
 Feeding order, a relation between rules in linguistics

See also
 
 
 Feed (disambiguation)